George Howell Kidder (June 14, 1925 - August 20, 2009) was a resident of Concord, Massachusetts. Kidder was a Boston attorney and patron of the arts.

Sources
George Kidder at Cuttyhunk 1938
Boston Globe: George H. Kidder obit
Tributes: George Howell Kidder

People from Concord, Massachusetts
2009 deaths
1925 births

20th-century American businesspeople